"Falling in Love Again" is a single by New Zealand singer-songwriter Anika Moa. It features on her début album, Thinking Room.

Chart performance
The single entered the New Zealand Singles Chart at number fifty, and peaked at number five. It spent a total of twenty-four weeks in the chart. It also spent one week in the Australian Singles Chart at number sixty-one.

Year-end charts

References

Anika Moa songs
2002 singles
2001 songs
Atlantic Records singles